Sukowice  is a village in the administrative district of Gmina Cisek, within Kędzierzyn-Koźle County, Opole Voivodeship, in southern Poland.

The village has a population of 374.

Gallery

References

Villages in Kędzierzyn-Koźle County